New Al Mirqab (also referred to as Al Mirqab Al Jadeed) is a district in Qatar, located in the municipality of Ad Dawhah.

Together with Al Sadd and Fereej Al Nasr, it makes up Zone 39 which has 23,853 people in it.

Etymology
The district derives its name from Al Mirqab district. An Arabic word, mirqab originates from "muraqabah", which in English translates to "watching". This name was given in reference to a large hill in the area on which people would gather to spot ships out on sea.

See also
Al Mirqab, also known as Fereej Al Mirqab

References

Communities in Doha